Stilian Ivanov( CV ) (Bulgarian: Стилиян Боянов Иванов; Stiliyan Boyanov Ivanov) is a Bulgarian film director and screenwriter.

Education
Ivanov graduated with a gold medal from the National Gymnasium of Natural Sciences and Mathematics in Sofia. In 1994 he received an MFA (Master of Fine Arts) degree in Directing at the National academy for theatre and film arts (NATFA) in the class of prof. Hacho Boyadzhiev.

Career
Still a student at NATFA, Stiliyan Ivanov started working in the Bulgarian National Television (BNT). In 2001 he got a job in Msat and created the television newscast “The Naked News” (“Golite novini”), which was cancelled by the National council for radio and television (NCRTV), and “Without Anesthesia” (Bez upoika) – a programme about the ups and downs of the Bulgarian media. He was an executive officer and artistic director of TV “Veselina” (2003-2004), where he created and directed 45 original spectacles in the TV variety show “Starry Music Hall” (“Zvezdno variete”). From 2004 till 2007 he was an executive officer and consultant of BBT TV, author of the shows: “Stardust” (“Zvezden prah”), “Paint Yourself with a Song” (“Narisuvai se s pesen”), “Tea or Coffee”(“Chai ili kafe),“ With you is Vasa (“S vas a Vasa”).

In May 2009 Stiliyan Ivanov created TV Art – a television and a website about art, culture, tourism and travelling. [1]   TV Art prepares a thoroughly authentic programme  and it first broadcast on 24 May 2009. In 2010 TV Art began airing on the Bulgarian cable networks.

Ivanov is a shareholder and executive officer of TV Art and co-owner of the production company Dodofilm and radio “Antena”; a teacher in documentary studies and Internet television.

Filmography
Stiliyan Ivanov is author and director of over 36 documentaries, 200 music videos and 1000 TV shows.

1995-2001
A film about Lili Ivanova – “Privately with Lili”, broadcast on the Christmas TV special of BNT.
For BNT he created the first celebrity show – “Faces” (“Lica”) and in 2001 - ”Elite”.
A biographical film about Vanga – created upon her request and broadcast on BNT, released on DVD in 2011. The film has stirred interest both in Bulgaria and Russia on a variety of occasions. BNT World still broadcast the film several times a year and the Russian national television OPT invites Stiliyan Ivanov on its most popular shows.
The folklore show “Darned Youth” (“Pusta mladost”) by ensemble “Pirin”, released on videotape and spread all over the world.
The poetic performance “Love, Love” with the actress Nevena Kokanova and the cello player Anatoli Krastev
The musical film “Songs without Borders”, shot in Greece, Turkey, Albania, Macedonia and Bulgaria
The folklore show “The Fourth Dimension” was created upon the request of an English production company, released on DVD and broadcast on BNT
A documentary film about prof. Cyril Stefanov
The children’s TV musical “Hero Rooster” (“Younak Petlio”)
The TV cabaret “Cabaret Bulgaran”
The documentary film “Rumyana”
The documentary film “Katie – a dream come true”
Documentaries about Nadka Karadjova, Valya Balkanska, Theodosii Spassov
A documentary film about Emil Dimitrov, which has aired on BNT as a two-part miniseries and later repeatedly broadcast on the national television and BNT World. The film combines an interview with Emil Dimitrov, stories of the singer’s family, the popular Russian singer Alla Pugacheva, Mitko Shterev, Iordanka Hristova, duet Riton, prof. Aleksandar Iosifov and many other celebrities and Dimitrov’s friends. In the beginning of 2011 Stiliyan Ivanov’s documentaries “VANGYA” and “Emil Dimitrov - Glory! Love! Loneliness!” were released on the Bulgarian DVD market. An initiative committee bought and gave away copies of both of the films to all Bulgarian regional libraries. These films are used as a reliable source of information for the publications, books and scripts dedicated to Vanga and Emil Dimitrov by a lot of journalists, writers and annalists.

2002-2009
The two-part documentary film “An Unfinished Story - Hacho Boyadzhiev”, released on DVD
Late night TV and radio show “Flight Over the Night” (“Polet nad noshta”)
TV theatre “The Man Eater” based on Ivan Radoev’s play
The documentary trilogy “About Dogs and People” (“Za kuchetata I horata”)
A documentary about the history and culture of Malta
“A Lighthouse for our Souls” – dedicated to Reverend Stoina and released on DVD
“The Vera Phenomenon” – the private life and talents of Vera Kochovska
“The healer Petur Dimkov”
“The truth about Orpheus”. The realization of the project took over two years. “The truth about Orpheus” is the most expensive documentary film made after 1989. The film was shot in 14 different countries where the director found museum artifacts and excavations connected with Orpheus and the Orphism. The film sold 20 000 copies. The film screened not only in Bulgaria but also in Turkey and India. An American film company got interested in the project, bought its rights and assigned the director the task to extend the film by turning it into a trilogy.
“The Thracians” – released on DVD all over the world
“Music”

After 2009
the documentary series “The Path of Human Civilisation” consisting of the films: “Mesopotamia – traces in the sand”; “Anatolia – the land of the mother goddess”; “Anatolia – the Land of the Sun” and “Anatolia – the Land of Tombs”
“This is Bulgaria too” – about the places in Bulgaria with “magical” energy: the seven Rila lakes, Madara, the archaeological reserve Yailata, the cliff Belintash, etc.
“Welcome to Turkey”- a project fulfilled with the cooperation of the Turkish Ministry of culture and tourism. The shooting of the film lasted 90 days and took place in the farthest regions of Bulgarian southern neighbour.
“Recipes for Happiness” – a film about healthy eating, the advantages of vegetarianism and the system of Emilova M.D.
“Lights from an Exhibition” – a film about the work and philosophy of the artist Lili Dimkova
“The Dervishes” – a film about the Sufism, dervishes and the Persian poet Rumi. In the end of 2010 Stiliyan Ivanov headed to Konya (Turkey) for the celebration of the dervishes and Rumi’s disciples from all over the world (17 December). There he shot a 56 -minute full-length film, which became part of the series “Reports on faith”
“Recipes for Happiness 2”
Documentaries about Bolshoi Theatre, Zvyozdny gorodok and the Russian Cathedral of Christ the Saviour
“Thank you, Emilova M.D.”

In 2011, 2012 and 2013 Stiliyan Ivanov led a master class on documentary studies and Internet television with journalism students and university applicants from Moscow, Tula, Sevastopol and Oryol (Orel). In September 2013 he was guest of the branch of Lomonosov Moscow State University in Sevastopol. There he taught another master class and was awarded by the Russian Union of Journalists for “high professional achievements”.

Awards and honours
From the Russian Union of Journalists for “high professional achievements” - 2013.
10th anniversary Eurasian TV and cinema festival – 2007
Second international film festival “True Heart” (“Vernoe Serdce”), Moscow – 2007
“I, Human” (“Ya - chelovek”), Orenburg – 2007
“Director of the year” – 1999, for pop folk music video
“Director of the year” – 1997, for pop folk music video

References
1.↑ About us

External links
 В Москве открылась выставка фракийских сокровищ из Болгарии (An exhibition of the Bulgarian Thracian treasure opened in Moscow – September 2013; in Russian)
 Наш режисьор снима филм за руската Троя (A Bulgarian director is making a film about the Russian Troy – September 2013, “Pressa” daily; in Bulgarian )
 Biography ( CV ) Stilian Ivanov
 For the feast of the dervishes in Konya - VIDEO - trailer
 The path of human civilization - trailer
 THE CRADLE OF HUMAN CIVILIZATION
 "The path of human civilization” Continues in Turkey
 Bulgaristan'ın TV-ART adlı televizyon kanalı Anadolu'da İnsan Uygarlıkları adlı belgesel için Kaş ve Demre'de çekimler yaptı (in Turkish)
 İnsan medeniyetleri yolunda (in Turkish)
 Redal Media Buys Bulgarian Film about Orpheus
 Вангу воскресят на экране (in Russian)
 Ванга предсказала, как отразится на человечестве глобальный кризис! (in Russian)
 Приключиха снимките на документалния филм "Пътят на цивилизацията" на ТVart - 70 милиона ще гледат филма догодина
 70 милиона жители ще гледат българския филм на TV Art - Пътят на цивилизацията

1968 births
Living people
Bulgarian film directors
People from Sandanski
Macedonian Bulgarians